Optimum Motorsport is a motorsport team known for success in sportscar racing, primarily with Ginetta and McLaren GT cars. Optimum also race under the Inception Racing banner. Their record includes championship wins in 2013 British GT4, class wins at 2012 and 2015 Dubai 24H, 2017 24h Series class champions, and most recently several British GT, GT Open, and AsLMS podiums and championships.

Overview

Optimum Motorsport is based in Wakefield, West Yorkshire, in the United Kingdom. In 2022 it is taking part in:

 FIA World Endurance Championship in collaboration with Project 1
 IMSA Sportscar Championship (as Inception)
 Le Mans Cup making their debut in prototype racing with a Duqueine D-08
 Asian Le Mans Series (as both Optimum and Inception, one car apiece) 
 International GT Open (as Inception Racing)
 British GT Championship in GT3 with McLaren customer cars (and historically, Optimum have additionally run Aston Martin in the GT4 class)

In previous years Optimum have campaigned in Creventic 24H endurance series.

British GT results

Creventic 24H results

Optimum Motorsport competes in the A6 Class.

References

External links
 Website

British auto racing teams
British GT Championship teams
International GT Open teams
WeatherTech SportsCar Championship teams
Auto racing teams established in 2007
2007 establishments in England